The 2004 Bridgestone Grand Prix of Monterey was the eleventh round of the 2004 Champ Car season, held on September 12, 2004 at Mazda Raceway Laguna Seca in Monterey, California.  Sébastien Bourdais took the pole while Patrick Carpentier won the race, the fifth and final win of his Champ Car career.  It was also the 22nd and final Champ Car event to take place at the Laguna Seca racetrack.

Qualifying results

Race

Caution flags

Notes

 New Race Record Patrick Carpentier 1:45:51.116
 Average Speed 100.217 mph

Championship standings after the race

Drivers' Championship standings

 Note: Only the top five positions are included.

External links
 Full Weekend Times & Results
 Friday Qualifying Results
 Saturday Qualifying Results
 Race Box Score

Monterey
Monterey Grand Prix
Bridgestone Grand Prix of Monterey